In Greek mythology, Astygonus (Ancient Greek: Ἀστύγονος) was a Trojan prince as one of the sons of King Priam of Troy by an unknown woman.

See also
 List of children of Priam

Notes

References 

 Apollodorus, The Library with an English Translation by Sir James George Frazer, F.B.A., F.R.S. in 2 Volumes, Cambridge, MA, Harvard University Press; London, William Heinemann Ltd. 1921. ISBN 0-674-99135-4. Online version at the Perseus Digital Library. Greek text available from the same website.

Characters in Greek mythology